Colonel Martin Bladen (1680–1746) was a British politician who sat in the Irish House of Commons from 1713 to 1727 and in the British House of Commons from 1715 to 1746. He was a Commissioner of the Board of Trade and Plantations, a Privy Councillor in Ireland and Comptroller of the Mint.

Family
Martin was born in 1680 in Yorkshire and was the son of Nathaniel Bladen and Isabella Fairfax. His father was an attorney and Steward to Thomas Osborne, 1st Duke of Leeds (Lord Danby), his mother was the daughter of Sir William Fairfax of Steeton and was related to Lord Fairfax.  Martin's older brother William Bladen was Attorney-General in Maryland and briefly Secretary of that Province and his nephew Thomas Bladen was Governor of Maryland in the 1740s. Martin's sister Elizabeth was the mother of Admiral Edward Hawke, 1st Baron Hawke. Martin acted as guardian to Admiral Hawke and supported his career advancement in the navy.

Military career
After initial education in Yorkshire, Martin attended Westminster School where he was a Queen's Scholar at St Peter's College and then attended St John's College in Cambridge. He was admitted to the Inner Temple in 1698 but did not pursue a legal career. He joined the military in December 1697 as Ensign to Captain Jos. Fletcher in Brigadier-General Thomas Fairfax's Regiment of Foot, Fairfax being his uncle. After an initial posting to Ireland, his regiment was deployed in Spain, Gibraltar and Portugal in Marlborough's service. When the Earl of Galway, Henri de Massue de Ruvigny arrived as the new Generalissimo of the British Army, he took Bladen as his aide-de-camp. Bladen was appointed Colonel in 1709 though within the year he had sold his colonelcy and retired from the military.

Political career
He commenced his career in politics by winning seats in 1713. He was elected as a Member of Parliament for Kinsale in Cork, Ireland that year, though was defeated as MP for Saltash in Cornwall. In 1715 he won another Irish seat for Bandon but again lost a renewed attempt at Saltash, though succeeded in getting a seat in Stockbridge in Hampshire. He was MP for Maldon in Essex in 1734 and Portsmouth in 1741.

In 1714 he secured a position as Comptroller of the Royal Mint and, throughout his time at the Mint, Isaac Newton was the head of that organisation. Martin only left the Mint after the death of Newton many years later. This post was not full-time and allowed Martin to pursue other appointments, and in 1715 (after declining Sir Robert Walpole's offer to be Envoy to Switzerland) he accepted a position in Ireland as Chief Secretary to his old military commander the Earl of Galway and Charles Fitzroy, 2nd Duke of Grafton who held joint Governorship. Bladen shared his role there with Charles Delafaye. In 1715 he was made a Privy Councillor in Ireland.

In 1717 he was offered an appointment as Envoy Extraordinary to Spain to replace Mr Brett but declined it. Instead he was offered, and accepted, a post at the Board of Trade and Plantations and attended his first meeting on 19 July 1717 as Commissioner. Bladen was a Whig politician who consistently supported Robert Walpole throughout his tenure in office.                                                                                                                                                                     
In 1719 Bladen, along with Daniel Pulteney, was appointed by the Lord Justices to attend the Court of France to negotiate miscellaneous items outstanding from the Treaty of Utrecht in 1713, such as limits of plantations in America and losses of the Hudson's Bay Company.  Whilst there he met with the 9-year-old Louis XV, his regent Philippe II, Duke of Orléans, Victor Marie d'Estrées, Duke of Estrées and Cardinal-Statesman Guillaume Dubois, when news came in that the French had captured the island of St Lucia.  Bladen immediately raised the issue with his hosts who seemed initially unaware of the news.

In 1721 Bladen produced a lengthy report on the status of the colonies in America which was along the lines of William Blathwayt's report of 1701 which sought revocation of proprietary charters, though he offered up the suggestion of the colonies being unified under a single military figurehead, a Captain-General, and suggested New York as a suitable geographical base – an idea first suggested by William Penn in his 1697 'Plan of Union'. Bladen was convinced that Britain’s power and ability to trade favourably with other countries was greatly enhanced by the income from her colonies and, for economic reasons, it was vital for the colonies to serve the mother country and the appearance of a unified Britain with her colonies would deter other European colonial powers from attempting encroachment. A final report on British Colonies in America was produced in 1739 "Reasons for Appointing a Captain General for the Continent of North America" which was more conciliatory in tone than previous ones where preservation of trade with the American colonies was considered more important than their 'subjection'.

Bladen’s influence at the Board of Trade continued to grow through the 1730s and he attended a Conference at Antwerp to negotiate on tariffs. He also, in 1730, was present at the Board of Trade meeting when seven Indian Chiefs of the Cherokee Nation attended to ratify the 1730 British Cherokee Friendship Treaty. He was also instrumental in getting his nephew Thomas Bladen, later Governor of Maryland, into Parliament and the two consistently voted the same way on issues.

Marriage and children
Martin married Mary Gibbs c1699.  She was the daughter of Colonel John Gibbs, one time Governor of North Carolina and her mother was Elizabeth Pride, who was a descendant and heiress of George Monck, 1st Duke of Albemarle.  Martin and Mary Bladen had one daughter, Isabella, who married John Tinker.  Tinker and Isabella had two sons.  Martin was brother-in-law to Nathaniel Rice, who was Secretary of the Royal Council of North Carolina and Acting Governor on two occasions.  After Mary's death in 1724 Martin married in 1727/8 to Frances Foche/Jory, heiress of Colonel Joseph Jory, Agent for Nevis, and owner of a plantation and several properties.  Frances inherited Aldborough Hatch in Barking in Essex, upon which Bladen built a new house where the couple lived.  Frances had several children from her previous marriage to John Foche but all died within her lifetime.  In later life, Martin was a Justice of the Peace and was largely responsible for driving highwayman Dick Turpin of the Gregory Gang out of Barking in Essex.  Martin's town residence was a Georgian building at the south end of Hanover Square.  He also owned the Barmoor Estate in Northumberland and leased the Prebendary Manor of Ketton in Rutland.  His will made reference to a Porter family, who mostly predeceased him and may have been blood related, but their line died out by the 1750s.  Martin died in February 1746.

Poetry, writings, and translations
Bladen translated from Latin in 1704 ‘C. Julius Caesar’s Commentaries of his Wars in Gaul, and Civil War with Pompey. To which is added Aulus Hirtius or Oppius’s Supplement of the Alexandrian, African and Spanish Wars With the Author’s Life.’  He dedicated this work to the Duke of Marlborough.  He also wrote 'The History of the Last War in Spain: From 1702 to 1710. Wherein the Conduct of the British Ministry, the Allies, and the Generals in that Service are Fully Defended'.  He also produced other works of poetry.

References

Members of the Privy Council of Ireland
Whig (British political party) MPs for English constituencies
1680 births
1746 deaths
People educated at Westminster School, London
Chief Secretaries for Ireland
Members of Parliament for Maldon
Freemasons of the Premier Grand Lodge of England
Members of the Parliament of Ireland (pre-1801)